Bones is the fourth studio album by Son Lux. It was released through Glassnote Records on June 23, 2015. With the release of the album, members Rafiq Bhatia and Ian Chang joined founding member Ryan Lott, transitioning Son Lux from a solo project to a three-piece band. It peaked at number 14 on the Billboard Heatseekers Albums chart, as well as number 10 on the Top Dance/Electronic Albums chart.

Critical reception
At Metacritic, which assigns a weighted average score out of 100 to reviews from mainstream critics, the album received an average score of 66 based on 13 reviews, indicating "generally favorable reviews".

Track listing

Personnel
Credits adapted from liner notes.

Son Lux
 Ryan Lott – performance, production, recording, mixing
 Rafiq Bhatia – performance, production, recording, mixing
 Ian Chang – performance, production, recording, mixing

Additional musicians
 Rob Moose – violin (1, 4, 7, 9, 11), viola (1, 4, 7, 9, 11)
 Logan Cole – upright bass (2, 6)
 Kristin Andreassen – vocals (2, 3, 5, 10)
 Joy Askew – vocals (2, 3, 5, 10)
 Jennifer Lott – vocals (2, 3, 5, 10)
 Cat Martino – vocals (2, 3, 5, 10)
 Nina Moffitt – vocals (2, 3, 5, 10)
 Sarah Pedinotti – vocals (2, 3, 5, 10)
 Kristin Slipp – vocals (2, 3, 5, 10)
 Elizabeth Ziman – vocals (2, 3, 5, 10)
 Alex Sopp – flute (3)
 Jackson Hill – bass guitar (4, 8)
 Hanna Benn – vocals (4, 6, 9), vocal arrangement (4, 6, 9)
 Moses Sumney – vocals (4)
 Liz Nistico – vocals (5), vocal arrangement (5)
 D.M. Stith – vocals (6, 7, 8)
 Elena Tonra – vocals (9)

Technical personnel
 Todd Carder – additional engineering
 Louie Diller – additional engineering
 Igor Haefeli – additional engineering
 Tomek Miernowski – additional engineering
 Ephriam Nagler – additional engineering
 Alex Overington – additional engineering
 Chris Tabron – additional engineering
 Pete Lyman – mastering
 Marke Johnson – art direction, design, photography
 Nathan Johnson – art direction, design, photography

Charts

References

External links
 

2015 albums
Son Lux albums
Glassnote Records albums